The taxation of trusts in the United Kingdom is governed by a different set of principles to those tax laws which apply to individuals or companies.

Inheritance tax

The inheritance tax ("IHT") treatment of trusts was substantially revised by the Finance Act 2006, with effect from 22 March 2006. The possible types of trust which can now exist for inheritance tax purposes are set out in the table below:

Notes:
An "interest-in-possession" means that a specific beneficiary has a right to the current income of the trust.
The spouse exemption exempts from tax any assets passing between spouses and civil partners.

Relevant property trusts are taxed:
On creation:
If the trust is created inter vivos (i.e. during the settlor's lifetime):
It is taxed at half of the current death rate for IHT. The death rate is 40%, and the 2012/13 IHT "nil-band" is £325,000. Therefore, if the settlor has made no gifts and settled no trusts in the seven years prior to settling a trust in 2012/13, it would be taxed at nil rate (0%) on the first £325,000 and 20% on the balance.
If the settlor dies within seven years of the settlement, the initial 20% charge will be recalculated as if it were a PET, and if that is more than the tax already paid, the balance will be due (but there is no repayment if the recalculation produces a lower result).
If the trust is created on death (i.e. a testamentary trust) it will usually suffer IHT at creation under the normal rules, because of the death. There is therefore no need for the trust to be taxed separately on creation.
To "ten-year charges", on each tenth anniversary of the settlement (or of the date of death, in the case of a testamentary trust). The rate is 6% on the value of the trust's assets exceeding the nil-band at that time.
To "exit charges" when money leaves the trust: most usually by appointment to a beneficiary. Simplifying a little, the rate of IHT is that proportion of what the next ten-year charge would have been, that the time which has elapsed since creation or the last ten-year charge bears to ten years.

The interest-in-possession treatment, since 2006, applies only to some trusts with an interest-in-possession (as defined above). Where it applies, such trusts are taxed by attributing the trust's value to the beneficiary who is currently entitled to the income. Accordingly:
On creation:
In the rare cases where they can be created in lifetime they are taxed as PETs.
They are taxed as part of the death estate, when created by will. A spouse exemption is available where the interest-in-possession beneficiary is a spouse or civil partner of the deceased.
On termination (i.e. termination of the interest-in-possession, which may, or may not, be the termination of the trust):
The value of the trust's assets is taxed at death rates upon the death of the interest-in-possession beneficiary. It aggregates with that beneficiary's estate, and the trust and the estate share the nil-band between them, in proportion to their values.
The value of the trust's assets is taxed as if it were a "PET" where the beneficiary's right to receive income ceases in his or her lifetime.

Source: Schedule 20 Finance Act 2006.

Law of the United Kingdom
Taxation in the United Kingdom
Wills and trusts in the United Kingdom